As a result of the Syrian Civil War since 2012, there are at least two flags used to represent Syria, used by different factions in the war. The incumbent government of the Syrian Arab Republic led by the Ba'ath Party uses the red-white-black tricolour originally used by the United Arab Republic, while Syrian opposition factions such as the Syrian National Coalition use the green-white-black tricolour known as the ''Independence flag'', first used by Mandatory Syria.

Flag of the Syrian Government 

The current flag was first adopted in 1958 to represent Syria as part of the United Arab Republic, and was used until 1961. It was readopted in 1980. Since its first adoption, variations of the red-white-black flag have been used in various Arab Unions of Syria with Egypt, Libya, Sudan, Yemen, and Iraq. Although Syria is not part of any Arab state union, the flag of the United Arab Republic was readopted to show Syria's commitment to Arab unity. The usage of the flag has become disputed because it is often associated with the Ba'ath Party and has come to represent parties loyal to Bashar al-Assad's government in the Syrian civil war.

The Syrian flag is described in Article 6 of the Syrian Constitution. The first paragraph of the Article states:

The flag is based on the Arab Liberation Flag, which had four colours – black, green, white and red – representing four major dynasties of Arab history: Abbasids, Faṭimids, Umayyads, and Hashimites.

Interpretation of the colors

Color approximations 
Valid for:      

Valid for:

Flag of the Syrian Opposition 

During the ongoing civil war, the Syrian opposition, represented by the Syrian National Council, then by the National Coalition for Syrian Revolutionary and Opposition Forces (commonly named the Syrian National Coalition) used a modified version of the independence flag first used in 1932 with a 2:3 aspect ratio. The modified independence flag began to be used as a universal display of the protesting opposition in late 2011. The opposition wanted to distinguish themselves from the current Syrian government and favoured the use of the flag used when Syria gained its independence from France. Khaled Kamal, an official from the Syrian National Council, now believes this flag to also represent independence and the end of Bashar al-Assad's government. Today the flag is mainly used in areas controlled by the Syrian National Coalition. The use of the modified independence flag is similar to the Libyan rebels' use of the pre-Gaddafi red-black-green-white Libyan flag from the era of the Kingdom of Libya in opposition to Muammar Gaddafi's green flag. The original 1:2 aspect ratio flag has been used by the opposition unofficially on several occasions.

Historic flags of Syria

Kingdom of Syria (1920) 

The Ottoman flag had been used in Syria until Ottomans left the country on 18 September 1918. In 1918, the official flag of Syria was the Faysal flag, or Flag of the Arab Revolt, the flag of the 1916–1918 Arab Revolt against the Ottomans. It was officially adopted by the Hashemite family on 30 September 1918 and remained in use until 8 March 1920. This was the first flag to use the green/red/white/black combination seen in most subsequent Syrian flags. The colours' symbolism has been described as follows: white for the Damascene Umayyad period, green for the Caliph Ali, red for the Khawarij radical Islamic movement, and black for the Islamic prophet Muhammad, showing the "political use of religion" in opposition to the increasingly secularized Turkish colonial rule. Alternately, it has been argued that the horizontal colors stand for the Abbasid (black), Umayyad (white) and Fatimid (green) Caliphates and the red triangle to the Hashemite dynasty.

Under the Arab Kingdom of Syria, the Faysal flag was redesigned with a 7-pointed white star imposed on the red triangle, and was in use until 24 July 1920. This flag was, however, adopted by Jordan somewhat later. The kingdom lasted for just over 4 months in 1920 before being occupied by France and formally incorporated into the French colonial empire for some 12 years.

French Mandate flags (1920–32) 

The Faysal flag was abandoned with the arrival of French colonials to Syria. The French High Commissioner for Syria, General Henri Gouraud adopted the new flag of the French Mandate of Syria (blue with a white crescent, see below) on 24 July 1920. Gouraud's flag was in use until 1 September 1920, after which Syria was split into separate territories, each eventually given its own flag (see below). On 22 June 1922 Gouraud established the Federation of Syria, which used a green-white-green flag with a French flag canton. When this federation was consolidated into the State of Syria in 1925 the same flag continued to be used until the establishment of the republic on 14 May 1930.

Independence flag

French Mandate and independence (1930–58, 1961–63) 

The flag of the newly established Syrian Republic, under the French mandate was determined by the 1930 constitution. The constitution was drafted by a parliamentary committee led by nationalist leader Ibrahim Hananu. At first, French authorities refused to allow the constituent assembly to ratify the constitution, and Henri Ponsot, the High Commissioner of the Levant, dissolved the assembly on 5 February 1929. After a public uproar, French authorities rescinded their decision and decided to approve the draft with some changes. On 14 May 1930, Ponsot issued decree number 3111, which approved the Syrian-drafted "Constitution of the Syrian Republic", and which in Article IV of Part I states:

The flag's green colour stood for the Rashidun, white represented the Umayyads and black symbolised the Abbasids. Originally, the three red stars represented the three districts of Syria: the "states" of Aleppo, Damascus, and Deir ez-Zor. In 1936, the Sanjak of Latakia and Jebel Druze were added to Syria, and the representation of the three stars was changed, with the first representing the districts of Aleppo, Damascus and Deir ez-Zor, the second Jebel Druze, and the final star representing Sanjak of Latakia. The flag was used as a symbol for the desire for autonomy, for Syrians to rally around when France reneged on its agreement to leave the country, due to the outbreak of World War II. The symbolism was as follows: black for the dark oppressed past, white for a promising future and red for the blood to be sacrificed to move from the former to the latter. The flag was adopted when Syria gained its independence on 17 April 1946. The standard was used until the creation of the United Arab Republic, a state union of Syria and Egypt, in 1958. After the collapse of the United Arab Republic, Syria continued to use the UAR's flag until 28 September 1961, when the independence flag was restored to disassociate Syria from the former failed union.

Ba'athist flags 

The current two-star flag of Syria was first adopted by Gamal Abd al-Nasser, president of Egypt and president of the United Arab Republic. The flag was changed from the former independence flag in April 1958 along with associated laws designed to create a greater Arab identity. The new flag took the coloured red-white-black bands from the Egyptian revolutionary flag, and the stars on the flag were changed from red to green to indicate the pan-Arab colours. The two stars represented Egypt and Syria.

After Syria left the UAR on 28 September 1961, the previous independence flag was readopted to disassociate Syria from the failed union.

Following the 1963 Ba'athist coup d'état, a new flag was adopted by its Revolutionary Command Council on 8 March 1963, and was used until 1 January 1972. In 1963, the Ba'athist regime came to power in Iraq as well, and the two Ba'athist governments began negotiations in Cairo in order to once again form a union between Egypt, Syria and Iraq. The process failed after the Iraqi Ba'athist government was overthrown in November 1963 but both Syria and Iraq did adopt a new flag to represent the union. This flag was not much different from the flag of the UAR, with only a change from two stars to three, in order to represent the addition of Iraq to the Federation. The three stars represented the unity of Egypt, Syria and Iraq, as well as three pillars of Ba'athism: unity, freedom, and socialism.

President Hafez al-Assad adopted a new flag on 1 January 1972, as Syria joined Egypt and Libya in the Federation of Arab Republics. The green stars were replaced by the Hawk of Quraish (the symbol of the tribe of the Prophet Muhammad). The eagle held the ribbon with the name of the Federation, but unlike Egypt and Libya, Syria did not include its name on the coat of arms. This flag was an official flag during the October War in 1973. The Federation was dissolved in 1977, but Syria continued to use the flag for the next three years. The flag was abrogated on 29 March 1980, and replaced by the current two-star flag in order to show Syria's commitment to Arab unity.

List of flags of Syria

Flags of heads of state

Military flags

See also 
 Coat of arms of Syria
 Pan-Arab colors
 Flag of the Arab Revolt
 Flag of Egypt
 Flag of Iraq
 Flag of Jordan
 Flag of Kuwait
 Flag of Palestine
 Flag of Sudan
 Flag of the United Arab Emirates
 Flag of Yemen

References

Bibliography

Further reading 
 Mohammad Dibo Debate: The New Syria between Flags and Languages, SyriaUntold 14 June 2016.
 
 

Syria
National symbols of Syria
Syria